Edward R. Murrow High School is located in the Midwood section of Brooklyn, New York City, New York and is part of the New York City Department of Education. The school is known for its theater program. Its success in the arts was recognized by Mel Brooks, who granted the school to be the first-ever to gain rights to the musical The Producers in spring 2008. It is a school of the arts where students are either music, dance, communication arts, theater, or art majors. The school was created under the supervision and leadership of Saul Bruckner, who was also the first principal of the school.

Murrow H.S. opened in 1974 with Saul Bruckner as principal. The school was named for the pioneering broadcast journalist Edward R. Murrow. Murrow H.S. was founded according to the pedagogical theories of John Dewey and the learning and teaching methods of John Dewey High School.  Bruckner retired in 2004 and died on May 1, 2010, in Brooklyn, New York. Anthony Lodico became Murrow's second principal. In March 2012, Lodico announced his resignation from Murrow in order to accept a High School Superintendent position. On April 2, 2012, Allen Barge assumed the role of principal of the school.

Academics
Murrow's academic year is divided into two semesters. Students receive new class schedules and teachers at the end of January. The daily schedule shifts depending on the day of the week, with class lengths varying from 45 minutes to an hour, and each class meets only four times a week. Rather than having a lunch period or study halls, Murrow students have free periods called "OPTA's" (Optional Time Activities), used for studying, eating, or relaxing.

In response to concerns over overcrowding and student behavior during free periods, the school administration made the decision to eliminate Optional Time Activities (OPTAs) during the 2022-2023 academic year. To mitigate this change, students are now required to have a pass in order to visit the library, and are restricted to eating lunch only in their designated cafeteria. The 285 suite, which was previously available to students with an OPTA, has been repurposed as an additional cafeteria to accommodate the students. 

During the 2022-2023 school year, the school implemented significant changes to its schedule. In contrast to the previous model, where students met with each class four times a week, the updated schedule now requires students to attend each class five times per week. Additionally, the schedule has shifted to a more standardized system, with each period is now at a set, specific time rather than varying times throughout the week. On Friday, the schedule is shorter.

Murrow has a number of unique features including:
 NYC High School adjusted its grade policies in 2013 so that a "U" is used instead of an  "N". The letter grading system, with each letter corresponding to a numerical measurement, e.g. E = 90-100, G = 80–89, S = 79–65, U = 65 - 55, NS = below 55 (No Show = student who never reported to class), and MI for Mastery in Independent Study.
 In calculating the average, E is treated as a 95, G = 85, S = 75, and U = 55. This means that for getting the highest grade in all classes, a student will not achieve an average higher than 95. In college admissions applications, an explanatory letter is forwarded to colleges to explain this fact.
In the spring semester of the 2022-2023 academic year, the school implemented a major change to its grading policy. Under the direction of the School Leadership Team, the traditional letter grading system was replaced by a numerical grading system. The new system assigns grades in increments of one, ranging from 65 to 100, with a grade of 55 representing a failing mark.
 Instead of using numbers to represent class periods, Murrow uses letters from A-J, excluding I.  The periods are called "bands" (e.g., A-Band, D-Band). Some students take classes that meet before A-Band and after J-Band. These bands are "0 (zero)-Band" and "K-Band"
 There are no daily "home room" meetings. Entering students are assigned to a "Student Communication Section", or SCS, and remain in that SCS until graduation. The SCS meets only on an "as needed" basis and is used solely for dissemination of school-wide administrative/logistical information (e.g., distribution of report cards or new class schedules; election of class officers); 2 morning bands are cut short to allow time for SCS to convene. For mandated citywide testing, students usually attend a half-day of classes, followed by the test in the SCS. 
Following the return to full in-person schooling after the COVID-19 pandemic, the school decided to eliminate SCS meetings. Instead, important documents and information are now distributed during B-Band.
 While many state-mandated courses (e.g., science- and math-based courses) are geared toward students of a particular class year, other elective courses (e.g., performing arts, physical education electives) are not; students taking these electives will usually find themselves in classes with students from other class years.

Edward R. Murrow High School is also known for its outstanding theater program. Their success in the arts was recognized by Mel Brooks, who granted the school to be the first-ever to gain rights to the smash hit musical "The Producers" in Spring 2008.

In attempt to diversify schools, some high schools in NYC, including Murrow, use the DOE's "Educational Option" model. Instead of tracking, schools admit learners of all capabilities by purposefully accepting a set percentage of students with high, middle and low test scores.

Student demographics
The 2021-2022 academic year saw a student enrollment of approximately 3,500+ students at the school. The ethnic makeup of the student body was diverse, with 30% identifying as White, 26% as Asian, 20% as Latinx, 18% as African American, and less than 1% as Native Hawaiian/Pacific Islander. Out of the reported 3,659 students, 9% were identified as English language learners. Additionally, 18% of students had Individualized Education Programs (IEPs).The student-teacher ratio was reported as 15:1.

Programs and activities

Theater

Murrow has a theater program that explores all the collaborative components of theater. Students learn all the aspects of theater including acting, technical theater, musical theater, and theater management. According to an article in The New York Times, students voluntarily stay after school work with theater program even on weekends and free periods. Students were painting the backdrop for the school's annual musical Into the Woods. Students prepare months before the musical. In the costume department, freshmen were busy sewing leaves and vines. Students were designing lighting sets.

Music

The school has instrumental and vocal music programs that includes large ensemble, small ensemble, solo performance, and musicianship. Both programs require audition. For instrumental music, students may audition for more than one instrument. Students must bring their own instruments (except piano, tuba, double bass, harp, percussion and guitar amplifiers, which are provided by the school) and a copy of the music they are performing. For vocal music, students must perform a song without accompaniment.

In 2018, the schools music technology program hosted the Second Annual Music x Tech Fest, a show in which students and alumni performed original songs and presented music videos that they had created to raise money for charity.

Fine and visual arts 

The school has a discipline-based visual art program that includes studios in drawing, painting, sculpture, mixed media, animation, digital media, photography, fashion, art history, and portfolio development. In 2014, the school renovated its TV studio.

Bilingual programs

The school has Spanish and Chinese transitional bilingual program open to English language learners. Classes in two major content areas are taught in English and the other language.

Sports

The school offers a variety of varsity and junior varsity sports. These sports include badminton, bowling, cross country, golf, soccer, table tennis and volleyball. The school shares an athletic field with Midwood High School.

Extracurricular activities

The school offers extracurricular activities including academic teams, art shows, chess, community services, concerts and productions, digital media. key club, mock trial, moot court, music technology, National Honor Society, robotics, s!ng, technical theater and virtual enterprise.

Chess

The Edward R. Murrow chess team has won seven national championships, fifteen state titles and sixteen city championships. The Edward R. Murrow HS chess team's success has been chronicled in the book The Kings of New York, by sportswriter Michael Weinreb. The Kings of New York follows the 2005 championship-winning season of the Murrow Team. It was reviewed positively in the March 4, 2007 NY Times Book Review. The team was personally congratulated by President Bush in the Oval Office on December 15, 2004. A movie, based on "The Kings of New York" will begin production sometime in 2014.

Notable alumni
Darren Aronofsky - director
Joey Badass - Rapper, actor
Jean-Michel Basquiat - artist
Salvijus Bercys - International Chess Master
Vitaly Borker – Internet criminal, cyberbully
Capital STEEZ - rapper
Nyck Caution - rapper, actor
CJ Fly - rapper
Yvette Clarke - U.S. Congresswoman
Jerry Colonna - venture capitalist
Dyme-A-Duzin - rapper
Jade Eshete - actress
Arabella Field - Actress
Anna Hahn - US Women's Chess Champion
Eliza Hittman - director
Jason Katims - screenwriter, producer
Irina Krush - US Women's Chess Champion
Alex Lenderman - International Chess Grandmaster and 2005 World under 16 Champion
Lil Mama - rapper
Zoe Lister-Jones - actress
Christine Marzano - actress
Javier Muñoz - actor
Adepero Oduye - actress
Edward Quist - director, artist
Kris Sanchez - Founder of UberFacts
Jennifer San Marco - Goleta postal facility shooting
Dave Sardy - producer
Jeffrey Alan Schechter - screenwriter/producer
Marcia Schofield - keyboard player
Michael Spiller - TV director/producer
Peter Steele - singer-songwriter
Marisa Tomei - actress
Richard Velazquez - PepsiCo executive; first automotive designer at Porsche AG (Germany)
Adam Yauch of the Beastie Boys - rapper
Xochitl Gonzalez - writer

Transportation

The school can be reached by public transportation, including the New York City Subway's Avenue M station as well as MTA Regional Bus Operations'  routes.

References

External links
School Website
Murrow Band-Aid (Schedule)
Saul Bruckner NYT Obituary

1974 establishments in New York City
Educational institutions established in 1974
Murrow